Paul George Barron (born 16 September 1953) is an English former professional footballer who played as a goalkeeper. He is the head coach for the Las Vegas Mobsters

Playing career
Born in Woolwich, London, Barron qualified as a PE instructor before becoming a professional footballer. He played for non-league Welling United, Wycombe Wanderers and Slough Town, before turning professional with Plymouth Argyle in July 1976.

He signed for Arsenal in July 1978 for £70,000, as cover for Pat Jennings. Barron made his Arsenal debut on 2 August 1978 against Manchester City but was unable to oust Jennings from the first team; after only eight appearances in two seasons he moved on to Crystal Palace in 1980. He joined Palace along with Clive Allen, while Kenny Sansom moved to Arsenal as part of the deal.

At Selhurst Park Barron was favoured by manager Terry Venables over John Burridge as Palace suffered a poor start to the 1980–81 season. However, Venables left in October 1980 to become manager at Queens Park Rangers, and Burridge followed in December. Barron made 33 league appearances that season, (in which Palace were relegated) but remained at Palace in 1981–82 and for the first half of 1982–83 as the Eagles finished 15th in consecutive seasons. Barron joined West Bromwich Albion in December 1982 and spent three seasons at the Hawthorns making 63 First Division appearances. In 1984–85 he joined Stoke City on loan, and played once keeping a clean sheet, in a 0–0 draw away at Leicester City. He joined Queens Park Rangers in August 1985 and he appeared in the 1986 Football League Cup Final for QPR, in their defeat by Oxford United at Wembley Stadium. Barron spent two seasons at Loftus Road which included a short spell on loan at Reading and in the summer of 1988 he returned to his first club Welling United.

Coaching career
After retiring as a player, Barron became a goalkeeping coach, working at Coventry City, Queens Park Rangers and West Bromwich Albion. He then moved to Aston Villa, before joining Middlesbrough in 2001. Barron was sent to the stands during Middlesbrough's away League Cup match against Tottenham Hotspur on 26 September 2007, after protesting about Gareth Bale's opening goal. In November 2007 he left Boro to become goalkeeping coach at Newcastle United.
Barron left Newcastle United in December 2010 following the departure of manager Chris Hughton. As of 2015 Barron is the head coach of the Las Vegas Mobsters a U.S soccer team in the Premier Development League's Western Conference.

Career statistics

Honours
Queens Park Rangers
 Football League Cup runner-up: 1986

References

External links
 

1953 births
Footballers from Woolwich
Living people
English footballers
National League (English football) players
Association football goalkeepers
Welling United F.C. players
Wycombe Wanderers F.C. players
Slough Town F.C. players
Plymouth Argyle F.C. players
Arsenal F.C. players
Crystal Palace F.C. players
West Bromwich Albion F.C. players
Stoke City F.C. players
Queens Park Rangers F.C. players
Reading F.C. players
Cheltenham Town F.C. players
Coventry City F.C. non-playing staff
Crawley Town F.C. non-playing staff
Queens Park Rangers F.C. non-playing staff
West Bromwich Albion F.C. non-playing staff
Aston Villa F.C. non-playing staff
Middlesbrough F.C. non-playing staff
Newcastle United F.C. non-playing staff
English Football League players
Association football goalkeeping coaches